Shuangbai County (Chuxiong Yi script: ,) is under the administration of the Chuxiong Yi Autonomous Prefecture, in the central part of Yunnan province, China. It is the southernmost county-level division of Chuxiong Prefecture.

Administrative divisions
Shuangbai County has 5 towns and 3 townships. 
5 towns

3 townships
 Anlongbao
 Ainishan
 Dutian

Ethnic groups

The Shuangbai County Gazetteer (1996:89-90) lists the following ethnic subgroups. All population statistics, given in parentheses, are as of 1986.

Yi
Luoluo 罗罗 (30,237)
Luowu 罗武 (3,455; autonym: Naisu 乃苏)
Ache 阿车 (20,543)
Chesu 车苏 (2,528): Candoutian 蚕豆田, Hekou Township 河口乡; Damaidi 大麦地, Yulong 雨龙, Ainishan 爱尼山
Shansu 山苏 (autonym: Lesu 勒苏): Guangming 光明村, Bajiaoqing 芭蕉箐村

Climate

References

External links
Shuangbai County Official Website

County-level divisions of Chuxiong Prefecture